The Ministry of Defence of the Slovak Republic (MO SR) is the primary agency of the Slovak Republic responsible for the planning and carrying-out of defense policy. It is the direct successor of the Czechoslovak Ministry of Defence. Its current headquarters is located in Bratislava. The current minister is Jaroslav Naď.

List of Ministers
Imrich Andrejčák (16 March 1993 – 15 March 1994)
Pavol Kanis (15 March 1994 – 13 December 1994)
Ján Sitek (13 December 1994 – 30 October 1998)
Pavol Kanis (30 October 1998 – 2 January 2001)
Jozef Stank (2 January 2001 – 15 October 2002)
Ivan Šimko (16 October 2002 – 24 September 2003)
Eduard Kukan (24 September 2003 – 10 October 2003)
Juraj Liška (10 October 2003 – 1 February 2006)
Martin Fedor (1 February 2006 – 4 July 2006)
František Kašický (4 July 2006 – 30 January 2008)
Jaroslav Baška (30 January 2008 – 8 July 2010)
Ľubomír Galko (8 July 2010 – 28 November 2011)
Iveta Radičová (28 November 2011 – 4 April 2012)
Martin Glváč (4 April 2012 – 23 March 2016)
Peter Gajdoš (23 March 2016 – 21 March 2020)
Jaroslav Naď (21 March 2020 – present)

References

External links
Official website

Slovakia
Defence
Slovakia
Slovakia